Rough Ridin'  is a lost 1924 American silent Western film directed by Richard Thorpe and starring Buddy Roosevelt. It was released by the Weiss Brothers on State Rights basis. The film was remade with Buddy Roosevelt in 1934 as Boss Cowboy.

Plot
As described in a film magazine review, Buddy Benson's sweetheart, Rosalind, has been completely spoiled by attendance at an Eastern finishing school. She returns to the ranch jointly owned by her father and Buddy. Buddy, disillusioned, becomes enamored of Mary Ross, whose brother Dick owns the adjoining ranch. Dick's forieman, Jack Wells, is a cattle thief. Wells kills a man and fastens the guilt on Dick, demanding Mary as the price of his silence. Buddy disposes of Wells in a satisfactory fight, winning the friendship of Dick and the love of Mary.

Cast

Preservation
With no prints of Rough Ridin'  located in any film archives, it is a lost film.

References

External links
 
 
 Lobby poster

1924 films
American black-and-white films
Films directed by Richard Thorpe
1924 Western (genre) films
Lost Western (genre) films
Lost American films
Silent American Western (genre) films
1920s American films
1920s English-language films